Robert Hogan may refer to:

Robert Hogan (actor) (1933–2021), American soap opera actor
Robert Hogan (judge), judge on the Tax Court of Canada
Robert Hogan (psychologist) (born 1937), American psychologist known for his work in personality testing and assessment
Robert J. Hogan (author) (1897–1963), American pulp fiction author

See also
Robert E. Hogan, eponymous character of Hogan's Heroes, played by Bob Crane
Bob Hogan, fictional character in Spooks